was a Japanese daimyō of the Edo period, who ruled the Akō Domain. His position was given to Asano Naganao in 1645 after Ikeda reportedly went mad, killing his wife and consorts.

References
This article is derived from corresponding content on the Japanese Wikipedia.

1611 births
1647 deaths
Daimyo
Teruoki